FNRS may refer to:
 FnrS RNA
 National Fund for Scientific Research, in Belgium

See also 
 FNR (disambiguation)